Joseph A. Nolan (January 20, 1857–August 19, 1921) was an Artificer in the United States Army and a Medal of Honor recipient for his actions in the Philippine–American War.

Medal of Honor citation
Rank and organization: Artificer, Company B, 45th Infantry, U.S. Volunteers. Place and date: At Labo, Luzon, Philippine Islands, May 29, 1900. Entered service at: South Bend, Ind. Birth: Elkhart, Ind. Date of issue: March 14, 1902.

Citation:

Voluntarily left shelter and at great personal risk passed the enemy's lines and brought relief to besieged comrades.

See also

List of Medal of Honor recipients
List of Philippine–American War Medal of Honor recipients

References

External links

1857 births
1921 deaths
United States Army Medal of Honor recipients
United States Army soldiers
American military personnel of the Philippine–American War
People from Elkhart, Indiana
Military personnel from Indiana
Philippine–American War recipients of the Medal of Honor